Kaitlyn Papp (born c. 1998) is an American professional golfer.

Amateur career
Papp competed for the Texas Longhorns golf team, where she was a two-time First Team All-American.

In 2016, Papp teamed with Hailee Cooper to win the U.S. Women's Amateur Four-Ball. She played on the U.S. teams in the Junior Solheim Cup (2015, 2017), Junior Ryder Cup (2016), and Arnold Palmer Cup (2018, 2019).

Papp earned low amateur honors at the 2020 U.S. Women's Open, finishing tied for 9th. During the tournament, her college coach was her caddie.

Professional career
Papp turned professional in June 2021. She earned her card for the 2022 LPGA Tour through qualifying school.

Amateur wins
2014 The PING Invitational
2015 AJGA Girls Championship
2018 Northrop Grumman Regional Challenge, Dr Donnis Thompson Invitational

Source:

Results in LPGA majors

CUT = missed the half-way cut
NT = no tournament
T = tied

U.S. national team appearances
Junior Solheim Cup: 2015 (winners), 2017 (winners)
Junior Ryder Cup: 2016 (winners)
Arnold Palmer Cup: 2018 (winners), 2019, 2020
The Spirit International Amateur Golf Championship: 2019

Source:

References

External links

American female golfers
LPGA Tour golfers
Texas Longhorns women's golfers
Golfers from Austin, Texas
1998 births
Living people